Serhiy Heorhiyovych Diryavka (born 18 April 1971) is a Ukrainian professional soccer coach and a former player.

Club career
Diryavka is a product of the Dnipro city football schools including regional sports college as well as FC Dnipro football school "Dnipro-75". He joined the senior squad in 1988 and played for its reserve squad for three seasons in 1989–1991. His first games for the senior squad he played in the 1990–91 Soviet Cup in home and away games against FC Alga Bishkek. The same season he also participated in the 1990 USSR Federation Cup group staged and featured in 4 games for Dnipro.

His debut at the Soviet Top League came about in 1991 in the game against FC Shakhtar Donetsk on 5 August 1991. Diryavka managed to play 7 games in Top League for that season which ended up the last one in the Soviet Union. He also played a game in the 1991–92 Soviet Cup against FC Metalist Kharkiv.

In the Ukrainian national competitions Diryavka debuted in the 1992 Ukrainian Cup in a home/away playoff against FC Bukovyna Chernivtsi on 2 March 1992. Few days later on 7 March 1992 he played his first game at the Ukrainian Top League against FC Zorya-MALS Luhansk. Next season 1992–93 Vyshcha Liha, Diryavka played as a captain for FC Dnipro and managed to score twice scoring his debuting goal Zorya Luhansk. That season the club was also the main contender for the championship title and tying with FC Dynamo Kyiv on points for the first, but yielding the title based on additional tiebreaker rules. Diryavka also played at clubs' international level, particularly the 1993–94 UEFA Cup debuting for FC Dnipro in the game against FC Admira Wacker Wien.

In 1995 FC Dnipro made it to the 1995 Ukrainian Cup Final where Diryavka scored against FC Shakhtar Donetsk during post-game penalty shoot-out. He stayed with Dnipro until 1995 before joined the newly created FC CSKA-Borysfen Kyiv. He had a very good start for his new club scoring twice in his first three games. CSKA-Borysfen finished 4th that season. After the season Diryavka returned to Dnipro, but after only three games he was loaned out to FC Kryvbas Kryvyi Rih. While playing for Dnipro in 1996 he also on a loan played a game for the Dnipro's farm team FC Metalurh Novomoskovsk. In 1997 Diryavka joined Kryvbas as a free agent. Before the 1998–99 Vyshcha Liha season he joined the newly promoted FC Metalurh Mariupol with which stayed until his retirement in 2004.

International career
On 28 October 1992, Diryavka made his debut for the national team in the friendly match against Belarus, but was substituted on 29th minute with Yuriy Sak.

Coaching career
Diryavka started his coaching career in 2006 as an assistant to Mykola Pavlov in FC Stal Alchevsk. Later that year he appointed a manager in FC Stal Dniprodzerzhynsk that played in the Ukrainian First League. He managed to keep the club's mid-table position in the league and reached quarter-finals in the 2006–07 Ukrainian Cup setting the club's record in that competition. After a season in Dniprodzerzhynsk (today Kamianske), Diryavka again joined the Pavlov's coaching staff first in FC Vorskla Poltava and later Illichivets Mariupol. After the Pavlov's retirement in 2015, Diryavka managed a club in the Dnipropetrovsk Oblast competitions. In 2016 he joined the coaching staff of Dmytro Mykhailenko in FC Dnipro that was threatened by FIFA with sanctions. Due to the sanctions along with Mykhailenko he moved to SC Dnipro-1 in 2017. Since 2020 Diryavka continues to serve as an assistant coach for club of Ukrainian lower tiers.

Career statistics

Club

International

Honours
Dnipro
 Ukrainian Premier League runner-up: 1992–93
 Ukrainian Cup finalist: 1995

References

External links
 
 

1971 births
Living people
Footballers from Dnipro
Soviet footballers
Ukrainian footballers
Ukraine international footballers
FC Mariupol players
FC Kryvbas Kryvyi Rih players
FC Dnipro players
FC Arsenal Kyiv players
FC Metalurh Novomoskovsk players
Ukrainian Premier League players
Ukrainian football managers
FC Stal Kamianske managers
Association football defenders